James Newton (1850 – 14 September 1913) was an English-born Australian politician.

He was born in Lancashire to bricklayer Jonathan Newton and Martha Betty. His family moved to Melbourne in 1857 and Newton worked as a saddler around Victoria. He moved to New South Wales in 1870 and settled at Hay. On 10 June 1875 he married Sarah Jane Carnochan, with whom he had five children. He later married Catherine Agnes Barrow on 27 October 1885, with whom he had a further eight children. A local alderman and mayor of Hay in 1887, he was elected to the New South Wales Legislative Assembly for Balranald in 1891, representing the new Labor Party. Disagreements about the pledge saw him contest unsuccessfully as a Protectionist in 1894. Newton died at Hay in 1913.

References

 

1850 births
1913 deaths
Members of the New South Wales Legislative Assembly
Australian Labor Party members of the Parliament of New South Wales
Protectionist Party politicians
English emigrants to colonial Australia